Bellevue is an MBTA Commuter Rail station in West Roxbury, Massachusetts. Located in the Bellevue neighborhood, it serves the Needham Line. It originally opened in 1850 on the Boston and Providence Railroad's West Roxbury Branch. The station has a mini-high platform for accessibility.

References

External links 

MBTA – Bellevue
Station from Google Maps Street View

MBTA Commuter Rail stations in Boston
Former New York, New Haven and Hartford Railroad stations
Railway stations in the United States opened in 1850
1850 establishments in Massachusetts